Vyscha Liga may refer to:
 Belarusian Premier League
 Bulgarian A Football Group
 Ukrainian Premier League